Elisabeth "Liesje" Schreinemacher (born 13 May 1983) is a Dutch lawyer and politician of the People's Party for Freedom and Democracy (VVD) who has served as Minister for Foreign Trade and Development Cooperation in the fourth Rutte cabinet since 10 January 2022. She previously served as a Member of the European Parliament from 2019 until 2022.

Early life and education
Schreinemacher was born on 13 May 1983 in Rotterdam, the Netherlands.

In 2008, Schreinemacher graduated from the University of Amsterdam with a Master of Science in Communication Science. As part of this degree, she undertook electives at San Francisco State University and Sciences Po. In 2012, she obtained a Bachelor of Laws degree from the University of Amsterdam, before going on to Leiden University, where she obtained a Master of Laws in 2015.

Early career
Between 2009 and 2012, Schreinemacher served as an assistant to Dutch MPs Johan Remkes and Jeanine Hennis-Plasschaert. She then went on to become an adviser at the Dutch Ministry of Defence until 2016. Between 2016 and 2019, she worked as a lawyer, specialising in construction law and contract law.

Member of the European Parliament
Schreinemacher was elected to the European Parliament in the 2019 European Parliament election, as Member of the European Parliament for the Netherlands.

A member of the People's Party for Freedom and Democracy, Schreinemacher was also part of the Renew Europe parliamentary group. She is a member of the Committee on International Trade (INTA) and the Committee on Legal Affairs (JURI). She was also a substitute on the Committee on the Internal Market and Consumer Protection.

In addition to her committee assignments, Schreinemacher was part of the parliament's delegation for relations with the United States (D-US) and a substitute member of the delegation on Relations with Japan (D-JP). From 2021, she was a member of the Parliament's delegation to the EU-UK Parliamentary Assembly, which provides parliamentary oversight over the implementation of the EU–UK Trade and Cooperation Agreement. She was also a member of the European Parliament Intergroup on Artificial Intelligence and Digital, the European Parliament Intergroup on LGBT Rights and the European Internet Forum.

Other activities
 Asian Development Bank (ADB), Ex-Officio Member of the Board of Governors (since 2022)
 European Bank for Reconstruction and Development (EBRD), Ex-Officio Alternate Member of the Board of Governors (since 2022)
 Inter-American Development Bank (IDB), Ex-Officio Member of the Board of Governors (since 2022)
 Joint World Bank-IMF Development Committee, Alternate Member (since 2022)

Political positions
In parliament, Schreinemacher lobbied hard for creating a two-way street regarding trade with China, saying, “Chinese companies should no longer be allowed to sell us things like buses as long as European companies don't stand a chance on the Chinese market.”

References

1983 births
Living people
Dutch women lawyers
MEPs for the Netherlands 2019–2024
Ministers for Development Cooperation of the Netherlands
People's Party for Freedom and Democracy MEPs
Women government ministers of the Netherlands
21st-century Dutch lawyers
21st-century Dutch jurists
21st-century Dutch women politicians
21st-century Dutch politicians
21st-century women MEPs for the Netherlands
21st-century women lawyers